Napeca (Nape) is an unclassified Chapacuran language.

References

Chapacuran languages